Philippe Wartelle is a French Olympic boxer. He represented his country in the bantamweight division at the 1992 Summer Olympics. He won his first bout against Jesús Salvador Pérez, and then lost his second bout to Roberto Jalnaiz.

References

1969 births
Living people
French male boxers
Olympic boxers of France
Boxers at the 1992 Summer Olympics
Bantamweight boxers